Miliusa is a genus of plants in family Annonaceae. Species have been recorded from tropical and subtropical Asia to northern Australia.

Accepted species

Plants of the World Online currently includes:

 Miliusa amplexicaulis Ridl.
 Miliusa andamanica (King) Finet & Gagnep.
 Miliusa astiana Chaowasku & Kessler
 Miliusa baillonii Pierre
 Miliusa balansae Finet & Gagnep.
 Miliusa banghoiensis Jovet-Ast
 Miliusa brahei (F.Muell.) Jessup
 Miliusa butonensis Chaowasku & Kessler
 Miliusa cambodgensis Chaowasku & Kessler
 Miliusa campanulata Pierre
 Miliusa chantaburiana Damth. & Chaowasku
 Miliusa codonantha Chaowasku - India
 Miliusa cuneata Craib
 Miliusa dioeca (Roxb.) Chaowasku & Kessler
 Miliusa eupoda (Miq.) I.M.Turner
 Miliusa filipes Ridl.
 Miliusa flaviviridis N.V.Page, Poti & K.Ravik.
 Miliusa fragrans Chaowasku & Kessler - Thailand
 Miliusa fusca Pierre
 Miliusa glandulifera C.E.C.Fisch.
 Miliusa glochidioides Hand.-Mazz.
 Miliusa gokhalaei Ratheesh, Sujanapal, Anil Kumar & Sivad. - India
 Miliusa hirsuta Chaowasku & Kessler - Thailand
 Miliusa horsfieldii (Benn.) Baill. ex Pierre
 Miliusa indica Lesch. ex A.DC.
 Miliusa intermedia Chaowasku & Kessler - Thailand
 Miliusa koolsii (Kosterm.) J.Sinclair
 Miliusa lanceolata Chaowasku & Kessler
 Miliusa macrocarpa Hook.f. & Thomson
 Miliusa macropoda Miq.
 Miliusa malnadensis N.V.Page & Nerlekar
 Miliusa manickamiana Murugan
 Miliusa mollis Pierre
 Miliusa montana Gardner ex Hook.f. & Thomson
 Miliusa nakhonsiana Chaowasku & Kessler - Thailand
 Miliusa nilagirica Bedd.
 Miliusa ninhbinhensis Chaowasku & Kessler
 Miliusa novoguineensis Mols & Kessler
 Miliusa paithalmalayana Josekutty
 Miliusa parviflora Ridl.
 Miliusa pumila Chaowasku - Thailand 
 Miliusa saccata C.E.C.Fisch.
 Miliusa sahyadrica G.Rajkumar, Alister, Nazarudeen & Pandur.
 Miliusa sclerocarpa (A.DC.) Kurz
 Miliusa sessilis Chaowasku & Kessler - Thailand
 Miliusa tenuistipitata W.T.Wang
 Miliusa thailandica Chaowasku & Kessler - Thailand
 Miliusa thorelii Finet & Gagnep.
 Miliusa tirunelvelica Murugan, Manickam, Sundaresan & Jothi
 Miliusa tomentosa (Roxb.) Finet & Gagnep.
 Miliusa traceyi Jessup
 Miliusa tristis Kurz
 Miliusa umpangensis Chaowasku & Kessler - Thailand
 Miliusa velutina (DC.) Hook.f. & Thomson
 Miliusa vidalii J.Sinclair
 Miliusa viridiflora Chaowasku & Kessler
 Miliusa wayanadica Sujanapal, Ratheesh & Sasidh.
 Miliusa wightiana Hook.f. & Thomson
 Miliusa zeylanica Gardner ex Hook.f. & Thomson

Unresolved species
 Miliusa sinensis Finet & Gagnep is a possible synonym of M. balansae Finet & Gagnep. Miliusanes, a class of cytotoxic agents, were extracted from M. sinensis. They are potential anticancer lead molecules.

References

External links
jstor.org
New Miliusa in India
Bioone.org
Miliusa Pollen morphology

Miliusa
Annonaceae genera
Taxonomy articles created by Polbot